Periorbital dark circles are dark blemishes around the eyes

Dark circle may also refer to:

Dark Circle, a fictional criminal organization in the DC Comics universe
Dark Circle Comics, an imprint of Archie Comics
Dark Circle (film), a 1982 American documentary film about the nuclear weapons and nuclear power industries
Dark Circles, a 2013 American horror film starring Johnathon Schaech and Pell James
The Dark Circle, a 2016 novel by Linda Grant